Gmina Dzwola is a rural gmina (administrative district) in Janów Lubelski County, Lublin Voivodeship, in eastern Poland.

Villages
Gmina Dzwola contains the villages and settlements of Branew, Branewka, Branewka-Kolonia, Dzwola, Flisy, Kapronie, Kocudza Druga, Kocudza Górna, Kocudza Pierwsza, Kocudza Trzecia, Konstantów, Krzemień Drugi, Krzemień Pierwszy, Władysławów, Zdzisławice and Zofianka Dolna.

Neighbouring gminas
Gmina Dzwola is bordered by the gminas of Biłgoraj, Chrzanów, Frampol, Godziszów, Goraj and Janów Lubelski.

References

Polish official population figures 2006

Dzwola
Janów Lubelski County